Thetford Mines Airport  is located  southeast of Thetford Mines, Quebec, Canada.

References

Thetford Mines
Registered aerodromes in Chaudière-Appalaches